SS Conte Rosso was an Italian transatlantic ocean liner that was built in Scotland in 1921–22, became a troop ship in the 1930s and was sunk by HMS Upholder in 1941.

She was named after Amadeus VII, Count of Savoy, the so-called "Red Count", and was noted for her lavish Italian interior decoration. Because much of its sailing would be in warmer waters, the designers included an outdoor dining area, unusual for ships of this era.

Conte Rosso had a sister ship, .

Building
William Beardmore and Company built the ship in Dalmuir, Glasgow for the Italian Lloyd Sabaudo Line. She was launched on 10 February 1921 and completed on 14 March 1922.

She had four steam turbines driving two screws by double reduction gearing.

Conte Rossos code letters were NJVH until they were superseded in 1934 by the maritime call sign IBEI.

Service history
She entered service in 1922 carrying passengers between Italy and New York City. She was the first new transatlantic liner built after World War I and the largest Italian liner to date.

In 1928 she was replaced on the New York route by the newer  and began service between Italy and South America.

In 1932 Lloyd Sabaudo merged with Navigazione Generale Italiana and Cosulich Line to form Flotte Riunite. Flotte Riunite transferred Conte Rosso to the Trieste – Bombay – Shanghai route. After 1933 this became one of the major escape routes for the Jewish population of Germany and Austria as Shanghai was one of the few places that did not require paid emigration visas.

Conte Rosso served as an Italian troop ship during the Second Italo-Ethiopian War in the 1930s.

Incidents
On 31 January 1925, 19-year-old Antonietta Gigliobianco mysteriously fell overboard from Conte Rosso to her death, orphaning her two-year-old son Ernesto. After he was turned over to the ship's chaplain, a media outcry in New York City ensued, which reunited the boy with his father Leonardo Gigliobianco.

Sinking
In World War II the Italian Government again used Conte Rosso as a troop ship. Of the 2,729 soldiers and crew aboard, 1,297 were killed.

See also
 David Wanklyn
 List by death toll of ships sunk by submarines

References

Bibliography

External links

1922 ships
Ships built on the River Clyde
Ocean liners
Steamships of Italy
Passenger ships of Italy
Troop ships of Italy
World War II naval ships of Italy
World War II shipwrecks in the Mediterranean Sea
Maritime incidents in May 1941
Ships sunk by British submarines